Monte Azul Paulista is a municipality in the state of São Paulo in Brazil. The population is 18,968 (2020 est.) in an area of 263 km². The elevation is 611 metres.

References

Municipalities in São Paulo (state)